The Afon Mynach is a small river in Ceredigion, Wales.

Its source is at the meeting of two smaller rivers, the Nant Rhuddnant and the Afon Merin. Both of these streams have their sources in lakes high on the Cambrian Mountains, the Afon Merin flows from Llynoedd Ieuan, and the Nant Rhuddnant from Llyn Rhuddnant.

The Afon Mynach is notable for the famous Mynach Falls in the village of Devil's Bridge (Pontarfynach), where the river plunges 90 metres into the gorge of the River Rheidol. It is also famous for the three bridges built one on top of the other in the same village, the lowest of the three said to be built by the devil (hence the name Devil's Bridge), but most probably built by the monks of Strata Florida.

Mynach